Jayamahal Palace was earlier known as Arni Hall and originally owned by the Jagirdar of Arni in Tamil Nadu around 1892. 
TJayamahal Palace Hotel is a 4-star heritage luxury hotel that offers a pleasurable stay for its guests.

References

External links 
 

Heritage hotels in India
Hotels established in 1903
Hotels in Bangalore
Indian companies established in 1903